Dendrobiella is a genus of horned powder-post beetles in the family Bostrichidae. There are about seven described species in Dendrobiella.

Species
These seven species belong to the genus Dendrobiella:
 Dendrobiella aspera (LeConte, 1858)
 Dendrobiella isthmicola Lesne, 1933
 Dendrobiella leechi Vrydagh, 1960
 Dendrobiella pubescens Casey
 Dendrobiella sericans (LeConte, 1858)
 Dendrobiella sericea (Mulsant & Wachanru, 1852)
 Dendrobiella sublaevis Casey

References

Further reading

External links

 

Bostrichidae
Articles created by Qbugbot